The Seoul Institute (SI) is the official think tank for Seoul, the capital of South Korea. It was established in 1992 by the Seoul Metropolitan Government as The Seoul Development Institute (SDI), and its name was changed to The Seoul Institute on August 1, 2012.

The Seoul Institute aims "to upgrade SMG's policies and to improve the quality of life of Seoul citizens through professional research". Utilizing their in-depth understanding of municipal administration, expertise in policy area in charge, and vast knowledge of overseas cases, Seoul institute researchers support the policy-making processes of the Seoul Metropolitan Government.

According to the official website, "The Seoul Institute’s goal is to establish a medium- to long-term vision for Seoul and propose social policies on welfare, culture, education, and industries and urban management policies on city planning, transportation, safety and the environment. SI’s primary objective is to improve municipal administration through professional research, improve the quality of life in Seoul, and reinforce and sustain the competitiveness of Seoul."

Research departments
 Department of Future and Social Policy Research
 Department of Civil Economy Research
 Department of Transportation Systems Research
 Department of Safety and Environment Research
 Department of Urban Planning and Design Research
 Urban Data and Information Center
 Strategic Research Center
 Megacity Research Center (Megacity Think-Tank Alliance (MeTTA))
 Seoul Public Investment Management Service

Six Major Research Tasks of the SI

Acceleration of ‘future studies’ required to design the Seoul of the post-growth era.
Selection of ‘citizen participatory’ research topics and establishment of open-type research platforms.
Enhancement of expert collaboration networks to realize ‘research innovations.’
Support of urban diplomacy of Seoul through the creation of the Global Cities Research Center.
Establishment of the Strategy Research Center with the aim of reviewing imminent municipal issues and discovering major agenda items of the future.
Supply of major research results through ‘Infographics'.

Publications
Aside from various reports, the SI regularly publishes a wide array of material including research on policy reports, global city trends, urban research in Seoul, economics in Seoul and administrative trends of Seoul.

History 
 2014.08.20 Kim Soo-hyun was inaugurated as the 14th President
 2012.07.26 Renamed as the Seoul Institute
 2012.02.17 Chang-hyon was inaugurated as the 13th President
 2011.01.28 Kim Sang-beom was inaugurated as the 12th President
 2007.11.05 Jeong Mun-geon was inaugurated as the 11th President
 2007.01.15 Je Ta-ryong was inaugurated as the 10th President
 2005.08.26 Kang Man-su was inaugurated as the 9th President
 2003.01.27 The complex was relocated to Seocho-dong
 2002.08.26 Paek Yong-ho was inaugurated as the 8th President
 1999.10.18 Gwon Won-yong was inaugurated as the 7th President
 1998.08.06 Gang hong-bin was inaugurated as the 6th President
 1997.02.01 Seo Jun-ho was inaugurated as the 5th President
 1996.06.10 Lee beon-song was inaugurated as the 4th President
 1996.02.10 Lee beon-song was inaugurated as the 3rd President
 1994.09.23 Jeong Se-uk was inaugurated as the 2nd President
 1992.10.01 The Seoul Development Institute launched
 1992.09.23 Choi Sang-chol was inaugurated as the 1st President
 1992.07.14 Approval of establishment of foundation
 1992.01.15 Promulgation of the Ordinance on the Promotion of the Seoul Development Institute

References

External links
 서울연구원 The Seoul Institute Official website
 서울시정개발연구원 (Seoul Development Institute) Naver Encyclopedia (in Korean)
 서울시정개발연구원 (Seoul Development Institute) Doosan Encyclopedia (in Korean)

Politics of South Korea
Think tanks established in 1992